Nerve cord may refer to:
 Dorsal nerve cord, in chordates
 Ventral nerve cord, in some invertebrates
(Note: both nerve cords are present in hemichordates)